Dilong (帝龍, which means 'emperor dragon') is a genus of basal tyrannosauroid dinosaur. The only species is Dilong paradoxus. It is from the Lower Cretaceous Yixian Formation near Lujiatun, Beipiao, in the western Liaoning province of China. It lived about 126 million years ago.

Discovery

Dilong was described by Xu Xing and colleagues in 2004. The name is derived from the Chinese 帝 dì meaning 'emperor' and 龙 / 龍 lóng meaning 'dragon'. "Di", "emperor", refers to the relationship of this animal to Tyrannosaurus rex, the "king" tyrannosaurid. "Long" is used to name Chinese dinosaurs in much the same way that the ancient Greek -saur is in the West. The specific name, paradoxus, is a Latinisation of the Ancient Greek παράδοξον meaning 'against received wisdom'.

Description
The type specimen is IVPP 14243 (Institute of Vertebrate Paleontology and Paleoanthropology in Beijing), a nearly complete, semi-articulated, skull and skeleton. Referred material includes IVPP 1242, a nearly complete skull and presacral vertebrae, TNP01109 (Tianjin Museum of Natural History), a partial skull, and IVPP V11579, another skull which may belong to D. paradoxus, or to a related species.

Feathers

Dilong paradoxus had a covering of simple feathers or protofeathers. The feathers were seen in fossilized skin impressions from near the jaw and tail. They are not identical to modern bird feathers, lacking a central shaft and most likely used for warmth, since they could not have enabled flight. Adult tyrannosaurs, found in Alberta and Mongolia have skin impressions which appear to show the pebbly scales typical of other dinosaurs. Xu et al. (2004) speculated that the tyrannosauroids may have had different skin coverings on different parts of their bodies—perhaps mixing scales and feathers. They also speculated that feathers may correlate negatively with body size—that juveniles may have been feathered, then shed the feathers and expressed only scales as the animal became larger and no longer needed insulation to stay warm.

Classification

When Dilong was first described, it was considered one of the earliest and most primitive members of Tyrannosauroidea, the group that includes the later, larger tyrannosaurids such as Tyrannosaurus rex. At least one later study, by Turner and colleagues in 2007, reanalyzed the relationships of coelurosaurian dinosaurs, including Dilong, and found that it was not a tyrannosauroid. Rather, they placed Dilong two steps above the tyrannosauroids in their phylogeny; more advanced than Coelurus, but more primitive than the Compsognathidae. However, other studies continued to find Dilong as a tyrannosauroid, and some (such as Carr & Williamson 2010) found Dilong to fall within Tyrannosauroidea, not among the more advanced coelurosaurs.

Below is a cladogram containing most tyrannosauroids by Loewen et al. in 2013.

In a 2014 study, Dilong was found to be a proceratosaurid. However, in an analysis by Brusatte et al. in 2016, both parsimony and Bayesian phylogenetic analyses placed Dilong outside of Proceratosauridae, as a slightly more advanced tyrannosauroid.

Paleobiology

Braincase scans indicate that Dilong had an S-shaped brain protected by thin meninges, unlike Tyrannosaurus which has a more linear brain protected by thicker meninges; this is probably a size-related trait, as it is in crocodilians. The large flocculus of Dilong suggests it was agile and had good balance, while small olfactory tracts suggest that its sense of smell was not as refined as that of Tyrannosaurus and other more advanced tyrannosauroids.

See also

 Timeline of tyrannosaur research

References

External links
 Original Nature article as a PDF
 New Scientist news article
 Natural History magazine article

Early Cretaceous dinosaurs of Asia
Feathered dinosaurs
Fossil taxa described in 2004
Tyrannosaurs
Taxa named by Xu Xing
Taxa named by Mark Norell
Yixian fauna